Manuel Vieira may refer to:

 Manuel Silva (sport shooter) (Manuel Moura Vieira da Silva, born 1971), Portuguese sport shooter
 Manuel José Vieira (born 1981), Portuguese footballer
 Manuel Alberto Vieira (1924–2015), Portuguese footballer
 Manuel Vieira Pinto (1923–2020), Portuguese-born Prelate of the Catholic Church in Mozambique